Kang Seong-mo (18 April 1933 – 5 February 2023) was a South Korean entrepreneur and politician. A member of the Democratic Justice Party and later the Democratic Liberal Party, he served in the National Assembly from 1988 to 1992.

Kang died on 5 February 2023, at the age of 89.

References

1933 births
2023 deaths
Democratic Justice Party politicians
Members of the National Assembly (South Korea)
South Korean businesspeople
South Korean chief executives
People from South Hamgyong